Marcus Maskell Marsh (1904–1983) was an English racehorse trainer. He was the son of the trainer Richard Marsh. His British Classic wins included The Derby and St. Leger with Tulyar (1952) and  Windsor Lad (1934) as well as the 2,000 Guineas with Palestine (1950). He was British flat racing Champion Trainer in 1952.

Marsh's career spanned over forty years until his retirement in 1964 with a break during World War II when he served in the RAF.

On 28 September 1936 he married tennis player Eileen Bennett.
In 1968 Marsh published his autobiography, Racing with the Gods.

References

Further reading
 Racing with the Gods Marcus Marsh 1968  
 A maharaja's turf : platinum jubilee of the triumph of Maharaja Sir Vijayasinhji Chhatrasinhji of Rajpipla in the Epsom Derby, 1934

British racehorse trainers
1904 births
1983 deaths
Royal Air Force personnel of World War II